The 1986 Michigan gubernatorial election was held on November 4.

The Democrats nominated incumbent Governor James Blanchard.

The Republicans nominated Wayne County executive William Lucas, who made history by being the first African American nominee for either major party for Governor of Michigan.

Blanchard was re-elected, winning the election with 68.1% of the vote.

This was the last time Kent County, home to Michigan's second largest city, Grand Rapids, voted for a Democratic governor until Gretchen Whitmer won it in 2018.

Primary elections
The primary elections occurred on August 6, 1986.

Democratic primary

Republican primary

General election

Results

References

Governor
Michigan
1986